Borten's Cabinet governed Norway between 12 October 1965 and 17 March 1971. The cabinet was led by Per Borten and consisted of the Conservative Party, the Centre Party, the Liberal Party and the Christian Democratic Party. It had the following composition:

Cabinet members

|}

State Secretaries

References
Per Bortens regjering 1965-1971 - Regjeringen.no

Notes

Borten
Borten
Borten
Borten
Borten
1965 establishments in Norway
1971 disestablishments in Norway
Cabinets established in 1965
Cabinets disestablished in 1971